Paul Anthony Hickson (10 May 1947 - 27 December 2008) was a British former swimming coach, originally from Leicestershire. He coached the British Olympic swimming team at two Olympics in the 1980s, but behind his sporting prowess, he had been a determined and devious serial rapist of teenage female swimmers, who had misplaced their trust in him.

Early life
He grew up on Norwich Road in Leicester, the son of Arthur Walter Hickson (29 August 1914 - 2000) and Iris Mary Wilby (19 October 1920 - 9 February 2009), who had married in 1940. His grandparents were John Henry (26 April 1888 - 1978) and Elizabeth Hickson (20 June 1886 - 1949).

At grammar school (since 1976 the comprehensive City of Leicester College) he swam for Abbey house; other houses were Bradgate, Charnwood and De Montfort. The school had its swimming gala at Spence Street Baths (Spence Street Sports Centre since 1982), where the Leicester Schools' Swimming Association had its gala. He gained two A-levels.<ref>Leicester Mercury Thursday 28 September 1995, page 3</ref> He swam for Knighton Fields swimming club in the 1960s, and also took part in diving competitions. He later swam with Leicester Swimming Club at Vestry Street Baths (closed around 1973, demolished, now Curve theatre).

He trained as a physical education teacher at Borough Road College, a teacher training college, in Isleworth (Osterley), around 1967. This college became West London Institute of Higher Education in 1976 when it merged with Maria Grey Training College, and part of Brunel University London in 1997.

Career
West Midlands
He moved from a Norwich swimming club to a West Midlands swimming club around the late 1970s.

University College Swansea
In 1983, he moved to University College Swansea. On Wednesday 22 January 1986, he was appointed to be the England team coach, which was not paid, with only expenses.

He coached the British swimming team at the 1984 Summer Olympics.

He was the head swimming coach for the 1988 Summer Olympics, and coach for the July 1987 World Student Games in Zagreb, Yugoslavia, featuring Elaine Gilfillan of the Dunfermline College of Physical Education and Neil Cochran of the University of Aberdeen. The team won three medals at the 1988 Summer Olympics; British Olympic head swimming coaches were appointed by the Amateur Swimming Federation of Great Britain.

Somerset
Whilst studying for an M.Sc. course at University College Swansea, he became the swimming coach at an independent school in Somerset in September 1991.

In June 1991, he picked a team of 30 swimmers for the July 1991 World Student Games, with 19 males and 11 females; 11 of these were studying at American universities, with Richard Leishman of the University of South Carolina and Sean McQuaid of Loughborough University, both from Scotland.

He was the England team coach for the July 1992 European Schools Swimming Championships in Caen in northern France.

Sexual assaults
Norwich
He had carried out sexual assaults and rape on teenage girls from, at least, 30 September 1976, when in Norwich.

Swansea
In 1986, the ASA had been told by three female swimmers that he had given them unwelcome attention.

When assistant director of physical education at University College Swansea, in 1987, he had made a female student strip naked in a fitness test. The female student had complained to the university, but he received only a written warning from the director of physical education. Female students were advised not to be alone with him in fitness tests. It transpired that six other female students had been stripped naked by him, during such fitness tests. The university did not alert the British Olympic Association or the Amateur Swimming Federation (headquartered in Loughborough) about his conduct. The university had viewed the incident as a 'one off', as no other incidents had been reported. When applying for his next position as a swimming coach, the university had also given him an excellent reference.

Somerset
On Saturday 12 September 1992 he was suspended from his position as coach at the Millfield independent school, after allegations of serious sexual assaults, against teenage girls, between 1984 and 1991, when working as a coach at University College Swansea, which South Wales Police investigated. 

He was given eight charges of indecent assault, and one charge of rape, at Cockett police station on Tuesday 3 November 1992, and appeared at a Swansea court on Tuesday 8 December 1992.Birmingham Daily Post Wednesday 9 December 1992, page 6

France
In September 1993, he absconded from appearing at Swansea Court, in relation to indecent assaults on eight teenage girls.

Arrest
Fifteen minutes into Crimewatch on Thursday 17 February 1994 at 9.30pm, he was featured as the first of four people in the Photocall segment, described by Superintendent David Hatcher as being 5ft 9in; the programme itself was fronted by Sue Cook. Four previous swimmers (from Norwich in 1976-81) had also contacted through Crimewatch, with two reporting rape (from 1976-77).Daily Mirror Thursday 28 September 1995, page 7 Had he not absconded, and his picture appeared on Crimewatch, the rapes would probably have not been reported?

On Friday 23 December 1994 he was followed by police from arriving in Kent, and found at Center Parcs holiday village, Sherwood Forest, next to the A614 in Rufford, Nottinghamshire, having returned from Roubaix in northern France, and re-arrested.

On Tuesday 31 January 1995, at a Swansea court, he was given another charge of rape.

Court
He eventually appeared at Cardiff Crown Court on Tuesday 5 September 1995, where he was accused of carrying out systematic indecent assault and rape over fifteen years. He was prosecuted by Sir Wyn Williams. He was defended by Sir Anthony Evans. Nine females gave evidence, against him, in court.

John Prosser gave him 12 years for two rapes, and five years for the indecent assaults.

Conviction
On Wednesday 27 September 1995, he was convicted of fifteen of the seventeen charges, including two of rape, by a jury of eight men and four women. He was cleared of two charges of indecent assault against a former Commonwealth Games swimmer and a twenty-year-old Swansea University student. Hickson was sentenced to 17 years imprisonment following the three-week trial. Following his conviction, the chief executive of the Amateur Swimming Federation of Great Britain expressed that the body were "extremely concerned" that one of their coaches could be guilty of such offences and assured parents that vetting and supervision procedures would be reviewed and tightened. On Wednesday 18 March 1998 at 10.10pm on BBC1, the fifty-minute Dreams of Gold was shown as part of Crimewatch File'', narrated by Jill Dando.

In October 2002, he attempted to acquire early parole, but it was rejected by Sir Roderick Evans, who noted that the parole board did not accept he had sufficiently changed his lifestyle to prevent him reoffending. Evans further expressed that Hickson had to demonstrate that the likelihood of him reoffending again was reduced, suggesting that this could not be demonstrated solely by the passage of time.

Personal life
He suffered from asthma.

He had married when 21, and had a daughter. He lived on Luddon Lane in Baltonsborough in the early 1990s.

References

1947 births
2008 deaths
1995 crimes in the United Kingdom
Alumni of Brunel University London
British Olympic coaches
Campus sexual assault
Coaches at the 1984 Summer Olympics
Coaches at the 1988 Summer Olympics
Crime in Norfolk
Crime in Nottinghamshire
Crimewatch
Criminals from Leicestershire
Criminals from Somerset
English diving coaches
English male swimmers
English people convicted of indecent assault
English people convicted of rape
English swimming coaches
History of swimming
National team coaches
Olympic Games controversies
People associated with Swansea University
People educated at City of Leicester Boys' Grammar School
People from Mendip District
Rape in the 1970s
Rape in the 1980s
Rape in Wales
Sexual assault in sports
Sexual assaults in the United Kingdom
Sports scandals in England
Sportspeople from Leicester
Sportspeople from Somerset